The 2007 Minnesota Twins season was the 47th season for the franchise in Minnesota, and the 107th overall in the American League. They were managed by Ron Gardenhire and played their home games in the Metrodome in Minneapolis.

The Twins finished the season with a 79-83 record, their first losing record since 2000.

On September 13, Twins general manager Terry Ryan resigned. He was replaced by Assistant General Manager Bill Smith.

Offseason
 January 11, 2007: Agreed to terms with Ramón Ortiz on a one-year contract.
 February 2, 2007: Re-signed Justin Morneau, Lew Ford and Juan Rincón to one-year contracts and Nick Punto to a two-year contract.
 February 11, 2007: Agreed to terms with Joe Mauer on a four-year contract.

Regular season
For the third year in a row, an important Twins personality died just before the beginning of the season.  In 2005, long-time stadium announcer Bob Casey fell to heart failure.  In 2006, Hall of Fame center fielder Kirby Puckett died from a massive bilateral stroke brought on by hypertension.  In 2007, Herb Carneal, the team's radio play-by-play announcer for 45 years, died from heart failure on April 1, the day before Opening Day.  The Twins announced that they would dedicate the 2007 season to Carneal's memory.

With a first-inning 'E4' on June 6, the Twins' Luis Castillo's major league record for consecutive errorless games by a second baseman ended at 143.  Over 647 chances, he never erred.  Detroit's Plácido Polanco had a similar streak running concurrently, and it ended a few months later at 186 games, the new record.
The Twins' representatives to the All-Star Game were Morneau, Hunter, and Santana.  Reliever Pat Neshek was chosen to be one of five players in the final vote for an All-Star player.  However, this spot went to Boston Red Sox pitcher Hideki Okajima, despite a campaign by Twins fans and national sports blogs to "Vote For Pat".
The collapse of the I-35W Mississippi River bridge occurred prior to the August 1, 2007 home game against the Kansas City Royals at the Metrodome. Public safety officials told the team that canceling the game could hamper rescue and recovery efforts, since a cancellation would send up to 25,000 people back into traffic just blocks from the collapsed bridge (I-35W runs behind the Metrodome). Before the game, a moment of silence was held for the victims of the collapse. The team rescheduled their August 2 game against the Royals to the afternoon of August 31. Traditional groundbreaking ceremonies for the team's forthcoming stadium (also located in downtown Minneapolis) had been scheduled to take place after the game, but were postponed to August 30.
Johan Santana broke the club record for most strikeouts in a game, with 17 against the Texas Rangers on August 19, 2007.
On September 7, the Twins and the Chicago White Sox entered the ninth inning tied 4-4 and left the inning tied 10-10.  It's the first time in the major leagues that both teams each scored six runs each in the ninth to force extra innings.  Chicago won 11-10 after thirteen innings.
With the loss to Boston on September 28, the Twins were assured of a losing season, the first after six straight winners (a record).  Before those six, they'd suffered through eight consecutive losing years (also a record).
Torii Hunter won his seventh straight Gold Glove award, the most for any position player on the Twins, and second in club history only to pitcher Jim Kaat's eleven.

Offense
While the 2006 team was known for the "piranhas"—gritty hitters lacking power but possessing speed and guile—the 2007 team saw the continued the development of power hitters such as 2006 league MVP Justin Morneau, Torii Hunter, and Jason Kubel.  After the Twins swept a July 6 doubleheader with the Chicago White Sox by a combined score of 32-14, White Sox manager Ozzie Guillén, the man who coined the term "piranhas" in 2006, stated: "They're not piranhas no more.  They're a shark attack now."  In the second game of that doubleheader, Morneau became the first Twin to hit three home runs in a game since Tony Oliva against the Kansas City Royals on July 3, 1973.  The Twins scored the most runs by one team in a doubleheader since the Boston Red Sox totaled 35 in a sweep of the Philadelphia Athletics on July 4, 1939.
Nick Punto, as of August 22, 2007 has the lowest batting average among qualified batters in the American League, at .201.

Pitching
The Twins entered the season with a problem in the starting rotation after Twins staple Brad Radke retired and Francisco Liriano had Tommy John surgery. The Twins signed Ramón Ortiz and Sidney Ponson to start. Ponson was released in May and was replaced by Scott Baker, Ramón Ortiz was moved to the bullpen shortly after and replaced in the rotation by Kevin Slowey.  However, Slowey was sent to the minors in early July, replaced by Matt Garza.  Ramón Ortiz was traded in August to the Colorado Rockies. On August 31, Baker took a perfect game into the ninth inning against the Kansas City Royals, before giving up a leadoff walk to catcher John Buck. His no-hitter also ended when he gave up a 1-out single to Mike Sweeney in the 9th inning. The game was won by the Twins 5-0.

Starter Johan Santana won a Gold Glove Award, the only one of his career.

Season standings

Record vs. opponents

Notable transactions
After their great amount of success in 2006, in which they came from behind to win the AL Central, the Twins wanted to be sure to lock up their 3-4-5 hitters (Joe Mauer, Michael Cuddyer, and Justin Morneau) to multi-year deals. The Twins were able to sign Mauer to a four-year deal worth $33 million, but Morneau and Cuddyer only agreed to sign one-year contracts, worth $4.5 million and $3.575 million respectively.

 April 9 – Placed Jeff Cirillo (medial meniscus tear in left knee) on the 15-day disabled list, retroactive to April 9; Placed Rondell White (strained right calf) on the 15-day disabled list, retroactive to April 5; Recalled Alexi Casilla from Triple-A Rochester.
 April 12 – Recalled Glen Perkins from Triple-A Rochester; optioned Chris Heintz.
 May 1 – Activated Jeff Cirillo from the 15-day disabled list and optioned Alexi Casilla to Triple-A Rochester.
 May 6 – Placed Joe Mauer on the 15-day disabled list with a strained left quad.
 May 8 – Recalled Chris Heintz from Triple-A Rochester.
 May 13 – Designated Sidney Ponson for assignment.
 May 16 – Placed Jesse Crain on the 15-day disabled list with right shoulder inflammation and recalled Julio DePaula from Triple-A Rochester.
 May 18 – Recalled Scott Baker from Triple-A Rochester. and optioned Garrett Jones to Rochester.
 May 22 – Placed Glen Perkins on the 15-day disabled list with a mild muscle strain in the back of his left shoulder; Purchased the contract of Carmen Cali from Triple-A Rochester.
 May 24 – Placed Dennys Reyes on the 15-day disabled list, retroactive to May 21, with inflammation in his left shoulder; Purchased the contract of Jason Miller from Triple-A Rochester and transferred Alejandro Machado from the 15-day to the 60-day disabled list.
 May 30 – Optioned Julio DePaula to Triple-A Rochester; Transferred Jesse Crain to the 60-day disabled list; purchased the contract of Kevin Slowey from Triple-A Rochester.
 June 28–29 – Heintz sent to minors; Matt Garza recalled.
 July 5 – Sent Slowey to minors; recalled Cali.
 July 22 – Activated Rondell White from the disabled list and optioned Garrett Jones to Triple-A Rochester.
 July 30 – Traded Luis Castillo to the New York Mets in exchange for minor leaguers Drew Butera and Dustin Martin.  Recalled Alexi Casilla.
 August 3 – Jeff Cirillo claimed by Arizona on waivers.
 August 8 – Called up Tommy Watkins.  Brian Buscher put on the 15-day DL.
 August 15 – Traded Ramón Ortiz to the Colorado Rockies for minor league infielder Matt Macri

Game log

|- style="background-color:#bbffbb"
| 1 || April 2 || Orioles || 7 – 4 || Santana (1-0) || Bédard (0-1) || Nathan (1) || 48,711 || 1-0
|- style="background-color:#bbffbb"
| 2 || April 3 || Orioles || 3 – 2 ||Neshek (1-0)||Cabrera (0-1) ||Nathan (2) ||24,439 ||2-0
|- style="background-color:#bbffbb"
| 3 || April 4 || Orioles || 7 – 2 ||Ortiz (1-0) ||Wright (0-1)|| || 27,539|| 3-0
|- style="background-color:#bbbbbb"
| -- || April 6 || @ White Sox || colspan=5|Postponed (cold weather) || 3-0
|- style="background-color:#ffbbbb"
| 4 || April 7 || @ White Sox || 3 – 0 || Vázquez (1-0) || Silva (0-1)|| Jenks (1) || 33,278 || 3-1
|- style="background-color:#bbffbb"
| 5 || April 8 || @ White Sox || 3 – 1 || Santana (2-0) || Danks (0-1) || Nathan (3) || 27,653 || 4-1
|- style="background-color:#ffbbbb"
| 6 || April 9 || Yankees || 8 – 2 || Pavano (1-0) || Ponson (0-1) || || 26,047 || 4-2
|- style="background-color:#ffbbbb"
| 7 || April 10 || Yankees || 10 – 1 || Pettitte (1-0) || Bonser (0-1) || || 24,552 || 4-3
|- style="background-color:#bbffbb"
| 8 || April 11 || Yankees || 5 – 1 || Ortiz (2-0) || Farnsworth (0-1) || || 30,131 || 5-3
|- style="background-color:#bbffbb"
| 9 || April 12 || Devil Rays || 3 – 2 || Nathan (1-0) || Stokes (0-2) || || 15,869 || 6-3
|- style="background-color:#ffbbbb"
| 10 || April 13 || Devil Rays || 4 – 2 || Kazmir (2-0) || Santana (2-1) || Reyes (3) || 27,783 || 6-4
|- style="background-color:#bbffbb"
| 11 || April 14 || Devil Rays || 12 – 5 || Ponson (1-1) || Jackson (0-2) || || 35,269 || 7-4
|- style="background-color:#ffbbbb"
| 12 || April 15 || Devil Rays || 6 – 4 || Stokes (1-2) || Nathan (1-1) || Reyes (4) || 27,024 || 7-5
|- style="background-color:#bbffbb"
| 13 || April 17 || @ Mariners || 11 – 2 || Ortiz (3-0) || Weaver (0-2) || || 19,015 || 8-5
|- style="background-color:#bbffbb"
| 14 || April 18 || @ Mariners || 5 – 4 || Silva (1-1) || Hernández (2-1) || Nathan (4) ||20,871 || 9-5
|- style="background-color:#bbffbb"
| 15 || April 19 || @ Mariners || 6 – 5 || Santana (3-1) ||Washburn (0-2) || Nathan (5)|| 19,350 || 10-5
|- style="background-color:#ffbbbb"
| 16 || April 20 || @ Royals || 11 – 7 || Pérez (1-2) || Ponson (1-2) || Riske (2) || 31,813 || 10-6
|- style="background-color:#bbffbb"
| 17 || April 21 || @ Royals || 7 – 5 ||Neshek (2-0) ||Peralta (0-2) ||Nathan (6) || 20,566|| 11-6
|- style="background-color:#ffbbbb"
| 18 || April 22 || @ Royals || 3 – 1 || de la Rosa (2-1) || Ortiz (3-1) || Soria (2) || 14,801 || 11-7
|- style="background-color:#ffbbbb"
| 19 || April 23 || Indians || 7 – 3  || Hernández (2-1) || Crain (0-1) || || 16,076 || 11-8
|- style="background-color:#ffbbbb"
| 20 || April 24 || Indians || 5 – 3 || Carmona (1-1) || Santana (3-2) || Borowski (8) || 20,849 || 11-9
|- style="background-color:#ffbbbb"
| 21 || April 25 || Royals || 4 – 3 || Pérez (2-2) || Ponson (1-3) || Soria (3) || 21,496 || 11-10
|- style="background-color:#bbffbb"
| 22 || April 26 || Royals || 1 – 0  ||Rincón (1-0)|| Wellemeyer (0-1) || ||18,520 || 12-10
|- style="background-color:#bbffbb"
| 23 || April 27 || @ Tigers || 5 – 3 ||Crain (1-1)||Zumaya (0-1)||Nathan (7) || 31,147|| 13-10
|- style="background-color:#bbffbb"
| 24 || April 28 || @ Tigers || 11 – 3 || Silva (2-1) || Verlander (1-1) || || 39,547 || 14-10
|- style="background-color:#ffbbbb"
| 25 || April 29 || @ Tigers || 4 – 3 || Jones (1-1) || Crain (1-2) || ||36,483 || 14-11

|- style="background-color:#bbffbb"
| 26 || May 1 || @ Devil Rays || 9 – 1 ||Ponson (2-3) ||Jackson (0-4)|| ||8,773 || 15-11
|- style="background-color:#ffbbbb"
| 27 || May 2 || @ Devil Rays || 4 – 3  || Reyes (1-0) || Guerrier (0-1) || || 9,101 || 15-12
|- style="background-color:#ffbbbb"
| 28 || May 3 || @ Devil Rays || 6 – 4 || Shields (3-0) || Ortiz (3-2) || Reyes (10) || 8,793 || 15-13
|- style="background-color:#ffbbbb"
| 29 || May 4 || Red Sox || 2 – 0 || Wakefield (3-3) || Silva (2-2) || Papelbon (9) || 34,951 || 15-14
|- style="background-color:#bbffbb"
| 30 || May 5 || Red Sox || 2 – 1 || Santana (4-2) || Tavárez (1-3) || Nathan (8) || 40,088 || 16-14
|- style="background-color:#ffbbbb"
| 31 || May 6 || Red Sox || 4 – 3 || Schilling (4-1) || Ponson (2-4) || Papelbon (10) || 27,807 || 16-15
|- style="background-color:#bbffbb"
| 32 || May 8 || White Sox || 7 – 4  || Rincón (2-0) || Sisco (0-1) || || 21,979 || 17-15
|- style="background-color:#ffbbbb"
| 33 || May 9 || White Sox || 6 – 3 || Danks (1-4) || Ortiz (3-3) || || 24,367 || 17-16
|- style="background-color:#ffbbbb"
| 34 || May 10 || White Sox || 3 – 0 ||Contreras (3-3) || Silva (2-3) || || 23,663 || 17-17
|- style="background-color:#ffbbbb"
| 35 || May 11 || Tigers || 7 – 3 || Maroth (3-0) || Santana (4-3) || || 31,458 || 17-18
|- style="background-color:#ffbbbb"
| 36 || May 12 || Tigers || 8 – 2 || Durbin (3-1) || Ponson (2-5) || || 32,176 || 17-19
|- style="background-color:#bbffbb"
| 37 || May 13 || Tigers || 16 – 4 || Bonser (1-1) || Vasquez (0-1)|| || 25,037 || 18-19
|- style="background-color:#ffbbbb"
| 38 || May 15 || @ Indians ||15 – 7 ||Byrd (3-1) || Ortiz (3-4) || || 23,325 || 18-20
|- style="background-color:#ffbbbb"
| 39 || May 16 || @ Indians || 7 – 1 || Sabathia (6-1) ||Silva (2-4) || || 17,678 || 18-21
|- style="background-color:#ffbbbb"
| 40 || May 17 || @ Indians || 2 – 0 || Carmona (5-1) || Santana (4-4) || || 28,609 || 18-22
|- style="background-color:#bbffbb"
| 41 || May 18 || @ Brewers || 8 – 1 || Bonser (2-1) || Capuano (5-2) || || 44,759 || 19-22
|- style="background-color:#bbffbb"
| 42 || May 19 || @ Brewers || 5 – 2 || Baker (1-0) || Bush (3-4) || || 44,427 || 20-22
|- style="background-color:#ffbbbb"
| 43 || May 20 || @ Brewers || 6 – 5 || Wise (1-1) || Reyes (0-1) || Cordero (17) || 39,119 || 20-23
|- style="background-color:#ffbbbb"
| 44 || May 21 || @ Rangers || 14 – 4 || Padilla (2-6) || Silva (2-5) || || 24,814 || 20-24
|- style="background-color:#bbffbb"
| 45 || May 22 || @ Rangers || 7 – 1 || Santana (5-4) || Loe (1-4) || || 27,013 || 21-24
|- style="background-color:#bbffbb"
| 46 || May 23 || @ Rangers || 5 – 3 || Bonser (3-1) || Tejeda (4-4) || Nathan (9) || 24,370 || 22-24
|- style="background-color:#bbffbb"
| 47 || May 25 || Blue Jays || 4 – 3 || Guerrier (1-1)|| Downs (1-1)|| Nathan (10) || 26,781 || 23-24
|- style="background-color:#ffbbbb"
| 48 || May 26 || Blue Jays || 9 – 8  || Tallet (1-1) || Guerrier (1-2) || || 31,434 || 23-25
|- style="background-color:#bbffbb"
| 49 || May 27 || Blue Jays || 4 – 2 || Silva (3-5) || Burnett (5-4) || Nathan (11) || 25,781 || 24-25
|- style="background-color:#bbffbb"
| 50 || May 28 || White Sox || 10 – 4 || Santana (6-4) || Contreras (4-5) || || 27,090 || 25-25
|- style="background-color:#bbffbb"
| 51 || May 29 || White Sox || 9 – 2 || Bonser (4-1) || Danks (3-5) || || 23,771 || 26-25
|- style="background-color:#bbffbb"
| 52 || May 30 || White Sox || 7 – 6 || Nathan (2-1) || MacDougal (1-2) || || 29,042 || 27-25

|- style="background-color:#bbffbb"
| 53 || June 1 || @ Athletics || 3 – 2  || Neshek (3-0) || Calero (0-4) || Nathan (12) || 20,219 || 28-25
|- style="background-color:#ffbbbb"
| 54 || June 2 || @ Athletics || 1 – 0 || Blanton (5-3) || Silva (3-6) || || 30,576 || 28-26
|- style="background-color:#ffbbbb"
| 55 || June 3 || @ Athletics || 4 – 2 || Gaudin (6-1) || Santana (6-5) || Embree (4) || 25,388 || 28-27
|- style="background-color:#ffbbbb"
| 56 || June 4 || @ Angels || 16 – 3 || Weaver (5-3) || Bonser (4-2) || || 37,380 || 28-28
|- style="background-color:#ffbbbb"
| 57 || June 5 || @ Angels || 5 – 1 || Escobar (7-3) || Baker (1-1) || || 42,001 || 28-29
|- style="background-color:#bbffbb"
| 58 || June 6 || @ Angels || 8 – 5 || Slowey (1-0) || Lackey (9-4) || Nathan (13) || 36,453 || 29-29
|- style="background-color:#ffbbbb"
| 59 || June 8 || Nationals || 8 – 5 || Simontacchi (3-4) || Silva (3-7) || Rivera (2) || 25,144 || 29-30
|- style="background-color:#ffbbbb"
| 60 || June 9 || Nationals || 3 – 1 || Speigner (2-2) || Santana (6-6) || Cordero (8) || 39,742 || 29-31
|- style="background-color:#bbffbb"
| 61 || June 10 || Nationals || 6 – 3 || Bonser (5-2) || Bacsik (1-3) || Nathan (14) || 31,035 || 30-31
|- style="background-color:#bbffbb"
| 62 || June 12 || Braves || 7 – 3 || Slowey (2-0) || Davies (3-5) || || 25,868 || 31-31
|- style="background-color:#bbffbb"
| 63 || June 13 || Braves || 6 – 0 || Silva (4-7) || James (5-6) || || 27,903 || 32-31
|- style="background-color:#bbffbb"
| 64 || June 14 || Braves || 3 – 2 || Reyes (1-1) || Wickman (1-2) || || 26,714 || 33-31
|- style="background-color:#ffbbbb"
| 65 || June 15 || Brewers || 11 – 3 || Vargas (5-1) || Baker (1-2) || Shouse (1) || 27,977 || 33-32
|- style="background-color:#ffbbbb"
| 66 || June 16 || Brewers || 5 – 2 || Bush (4-6) || Bonser (5-3) || Cordero (25) || 37,117 || 33-33
|- style="background-color:#bbffbb"
| 67 || June 17 || Brewers || 10 – 9 || Nathan (3-1) || Spurling (1-1) || || 31,624 || 34-33
|- style="background-color:#ffbbbb"
| 68 || June 18 || @ Mets || 8 – 1 || Maine (7-4) || Silva (4-8) || || 37,319 || 34-34
|- style="background-color:#bbffbb"
| 69 || June 19 || @ Mets || 9 – 0 || Santana (7-6) || Sosa (6-3) || || 40,935 || 35-34
|- style="background-color:#bbffbb"
| 70 || June 20 || @ Mets || 6 – 2 || Baker (2-2) || Pérez (7-6) || || 44,517 || 36-34
|- style="background-color:#ffbbbb"
| 71 || June 22 || @ Marlins || 5 – 4 || Benítez (2-3) || Rincón (2-1) || Gregg (14) || 15,271 || 36-35
|- style="background-color:#bbffbb"
| 72 || June 23 || @ Marlins || 11 – 1 || Silva (5-8) || Johnson (0-2) || || 21,368 || 37-35
|- style="background-color:#bbffbb"
| 73 || June 24 || @ Marlins || 7 – 4 || Santana (8-6) || Kim (3-4) || || 15,035 || 38-35
|- style="background-color:#ffbbbb"
| 74 || June 25 || Blue Jays || 8 – 5 || Halladay (9-2) || Guerrier (1-3)|| Accardo (9) || 24,240 || 38-36
|- style="background-color:#bbffbb"
| 75 || June 26 || Blue Jays || 2 – 1  || Rincón (3-1) || Tallet (2-2) || || 27,000 || 39-36
|- style="background-color:#ffbbbb"
| 76 || June 27 || Blue Jays || 5 – 4 || Towers (3-5) || Bonser (5-4) || Accardo (10) || 30,959 || 39-37
|- style="background-color:#bbffbb"
| 77 || June 28 || Blue Jays || 8 – 5 || Silva (6-8) || Frasor (1-3)|| Nathan (15) || 31,038 || 40-37
|- style="background-color:#bbffbb"
| 78 || June 29 || @ Tigers || 11 – 1 || Santana (9-6) || Verlander (9-3) || || 42,361 || 41-37
|- style="background-color:#bbffbb"
| 79 || June 30 || @ Tigers || 8 – 5 || Slowey (3-0) || Miller (3-2) || Nathan (16) || 41,588 || 42-37

|- style="background-color:#ffbbbb"
| 80 || July 1 || @ Tigers || 1 – 0 || Bonderman (9-1) || Baker (2-3) || Jones (20) || 41,078 || 42-38
|- style="background-color:#ffbbbb"
| 81 || July 2 || @ Yankees || 5 – 1 || Clemens (2-3) || Bonser (5-5) || || 53,036 || 42-39
|- style="background-color:#ffbbbb"
| 82 || July 3 || @ Yankees || 8 – 0 || Wang (8-4) || Silva (6-9) || || 53,862 || 42-40
|- style="background-color:#bbffbb"
| 83 || July 4 || @ Yankees || 6 – 2 || Santana (10-6) || Mussina (4-6) || || 52,040 || 43-40
|- style="background-color:#ffbbbb"
| 84 || July 5 || @ Yankees || 7 – 6 || Farnsworth (1-1) || Neshek (3-1) || Rivera (11) || 52,471 || 43-41
|- style="background-color:#bbffbb"
| 85 || July 6 || @ White Sox || 20 – 14 || Baker (3-3) || Garland (6-6) || || 31,543 || 44-41
|- style="background-color:#bbffbb"
| 86 || July 6 || @ White Sox || 12 – 0 || Garza (1-0) || Floyd (0-1) || || 32,426 || 45-41
|- style="background-color:#ffbbbb"
| 87 || July 7 || @ White Sox || 3 – 1 || Buehrle (6-4) || Bonser (5-6) || Jenks (23) || 36,791 || 45-42
|- style="background-color:#ffbbbb"
| 88 || July 8 || @ White Sox || 6 – 3 || Vázquez (6-5) || Silva (6-10) || || 32,724 || 45-43
|- style="background-color:#bbffbb"
| 89 || July 12 || Athletics || 6 – 2 || Baker (4-3) || Gaudin (8-4) || || 25,207 || 46-43
|- style="background-color:#bbffbb"
| 90 || July 13 || Athletics || 5 – 3 || Santana (11-6) || DiNardo (3-6) || Nathan (17) || 36,338 || 47-43
|- style="background-color:#bbffbb"
| 91 || July 14 || Athletics || 4 – 3 || Silva (6-10) || Blanton (8-6) || Nathan (18) || 36,066 || 48-43
|- style="background-color:#bbffbb"
| 92 || July 15 || Athletics || 4 – 3 || Neshek (4-1) || Kennedy (2-8) || || 36,737 || 49-43
|- style="background-color:#ffbbbb"
| 93 || July 17 || Tigers || 1 – 0 || Robertson (6-6) || Garza (1-1) || Jones (24) || 30,939 || 49-44
|- style="background-color:#ffbbbb"
| 94 || July 18 || Tigers || 3 – 2 || Miller (5-3) || Santana (10-7) || Jones (25) || 38,070 || 49-45
|- style="background-color:#ffbbbb"
| 95 || July 19 || Tigers || 4 – 3  || Miner (1-1) || Nathan (3-2) || Jones (26) || 36,551 || 49-46
|- style="background-color:#bbffbb"
| 96 || July 20 || Angels || 7 – 5 || Silva (8-10) || Lackey (12-6) || Nathan (19) || 35,794 || 50-46
|- style="background-color:#bbffbb"
| 97 || July 21 || Angels || 5 – 2 || Neshek (5-1) || Shields (2-3) || Nathan (20) || 33,868 || 51-46
|- style="background-color:#ffbbbb"
| 98 || July 22 || Angels || 7 – 2 || Saunders (4-0) || Garza (1-2) || || 33,217 || 51-47
|- style="background-color:#ffbbbb"
| 99 || July 23 || @ Blue Jays || 6 – 4 || Marcum (6-4) || Santana (11-8) || Accardo (16) || 26,091 || 51-48
|- style="background-color:#ffbbbb"
| 100 || July 24 || @ Blue Jays || 7 – 0 || McGowan (7-5) || Baker (4-4) || || 30,669 || 51-49
|- style="background-color:#ffbbbb"
| 101 || July 25 || @ Blue Jays || 13 – 1 || Litsch (3-4) || Silva (8-11) || || 37,342 || 51-50
|- style="background-color:#ffbbbb"
| 102 || July 27 || @ Indians || 10 – 4 || Byrd (9-4) || Bonser (5-7) || || 37-292 || 51-51
|- style="background-color:#bbffbb"
| 103 || July 28 || @ Indians || 3 – 2 || Neshek (6-1) || Borowski (2-4) || Nathan (21) || 41,203 || 52-51
|- style="background-color:#bbffbb"
| 104 || July 29 || @ Indians || 4 – 1 || Reyes (2-1) ||Sabathia (13-6) || Nathan (22) || 37,102 || 53-51
|- style="background-color:#bbffbb"
| 105 || July 30 || Royals || 3 – 1 || Baker (5-4) || Meche (7-8) || Nathan (23) || 23,628 || 54-51
|- style="background-color:#bbffbb"
| 106 || July 31 || Royals || 5 – 3 || Silva (9-11) || de la Rosa (8-11) || Nathan (24) || 22,890 || 55-51

|- style="background-color:#ffbbbb"
| 107 || August 1 || Royals || 5 – 3  || Greinke (5-5) || Rincón (3-2) || Soria (11) || 24,880 || 55-52
|- style="background-color:#bbbbbb"
| -- || August 2 || Royals ||colspan=5|Postponed (I-35W bridge collapse) || 55-52
|- style="background-color:#ffbbbb"
| 108 || August 3 || Indians || 5 – 4 || Sabathia (14-6) || Santana (11-9) || Borowski (30) || 31,664 || 55-53
|- style="background-color:#bbffbb"
| 109 || August 4 || Indians || 3 – 2 || Ortiz (4-4) || Laffey (0-1) || Nathan (25) || 33,663 || 56-53
|- style="background-color:#bbffbb"
| 110 || August 5 || Indians || 1 – 0 || Baker (6-4) || Carmona (13-6) || Nathan (26) || 38,334 || 57-53
|- style="background-color:#ffbbbb"
| 111 || August 6 || Indians || 4 – 0 || Byrd (10-4) || Silva (9-12) || || 28,314 || 57-54
|- style="background-color:#ffbbbb"
| 112 || August 7 || @ Royals || 5 – 1 || Bannister (8-6) || Bonser (5-8) || || 15,648 || 57-55
|- style="background-color:#bbffbb"
| 113 || August 8 || @ Royals || 11 – 4 || Santana (12-9) || Pérez (6-11) || || 21,503 || 58-55
|- style="background-color:#ffbbbb"
| 114 || August 9 || @ Royals || 1 – 0 || Davies (1-0) || Garza (1-3) || Soria (12) || 14,569 || 58-56
|- style="background-color:#ffbbbb"
| 115 || August 10 || @ Angels || 10 – 1 || Escobar (12-6) || Baker (6-5) || || 43,810 || 58-57
|- style="background-color:#ffbbbb"
| 116 || August 11 || @ Angels || 4 – 3 || Lackey (15-6) || Neshek (6-2) || Rodríguez (29) || 44,064 || 58-58
|- style="background-color:#ffbbbb"
| 117 || August 12 || @ Angels || 6 – 2 || Jer Weaver (8-5) || Bonser (5-9) || || 43,911 || 58-59
|- style="background-color:#ffbbbb"
| 118 || August 13 || @ Mariners || 4 – 3 || Putz (2-1) || Guerrier (1-4) || || 37,902 || 58-60
|- style="background-color:#bbffbb"
| 119 || August 14 || @ Mariners || 11 – 3 || Garza (2-3) || Ramírez (7-4) || || 33,729 || 59-60
|- style="background-color:#bbffbb"
| 120 || August 15 || @ Mariners || 6 – 1 || Neshek (7-2) || Washburn (8-10) || || 42,921 || 60-60
|- style="background-color:#bbffbb"
| 121 || August 17 || Rangers || 2 – 1  || Guerrier (2-4) || Wright (3-5) || || 30,924 || 61-60
|- style="background-color:#ffbbbb"
| 122 || August 18 || Rangers || 5 – 0 || Loe (6-9) || Bonser (5-10) || || 41,037 || 61-61
|- style="background-color:#bbffbb"
| 123 || August 19 || Rangers || 1 – 0 || Santana (13-9) || Millwood (8-10) || Nathan (27) || 36,353 || 62-61
|- style="background-color:#ffbbbb"
| 124 || August 20 || Mariners || 9 – 4 || Ramírez (8-4) || Garza (2-4) || || 31,755 || 62-62
|- style="background-color:#ffbbbb"
| 125 || August 21 || Mariners || 7 – 2 || Washburn (9-10) || Baker (6-6) || || 42,373 || 62-63
|- style="background-color:#bbffbb"
| 126 || August 22 || Mariners || 8 – 4 || Silva (10-12) || Batista (13-9) || || 29,881 || 63-63
|- style="background-color:#bbffbb"
| 127 || August 23 || @ Orioles || 5 – 2 || Bonser (6-10) || Trachsel (6-8) || Guerrier (1) || 19,389 || 64-63
|- style="background-color:#bbffbb"
| 128 || August 24 || @ Orioles || 7 – 4 || Santana (14-9) || Hoey (1-2) || Nathan (28) || 29,742 || 65-63
|- style="background-color:#bbffbb"
| 129 || August 25 || @ Orioles || 8 – 1 || Garza (3-4) || Liz (0-1) || || 28,700 || 66-63
|- style="background-color:#bbffbb"
| 130 || August 26 || @ Orioles || 11 – 3 || Baker (7-6) || Bédard (13-5) || || 30,876 || 67-63
|- style="background-color:#ffbbbb"
| 131 || August 27 || @ Indians || 8 – 3 || Byrd (13-5) || Silva (10-13) || || 23,178 || 67-64
|- style="background-color:#ffbbbb"
| 132 || August 28 || @ Indians || 6 – 5 || Westbrook (5-7) || Bonser (6-11) || Borowski (38) || 24,784 || 67-65
|- style="background-color:#ffbbbb"
| 133 || August 29 || @ Indians || 4 – 3 || Sabathia (15-7) || Santana (14-10) || Borowski (39) || 27,303 || 67-66
|- style="background-color:#ffbbbb"
| 134 || August 31 || Royals || 9 – 4 || Davies (6-11) || Garza (3-5) || || 15,736 || 67-67
|- style="background-color:#bbffbb"
| 135 || August 31 || Royals || 5 – 0 || Baker (8-6) || Meche (7-12) || || 24,986 || 68-67

|- style="background-color:#bbffbb"
| 136 || September 1 || Royals || 6 – 4 || Silva (11-13) || Duckworth (2-4) || Nathan (29) || 21,738 || 69-67
|- style="background-color:#ffbbbb"
| 137 || September 2 || Royals || 8 – 1 || Bannister (12-7) || Bonser (6-12) || || 26,454 || 69-68
|- style="background-color:#ffbbbb"
| 138 || September 3 || Indians || 5 – 0 || Sabathia (16-7) || Santana (14-11) || || 24,105 || 69-69
|- style="background-color:#ffbbbb"
| 139 || September 4 || Indians || 7 – 5  || Betancourt (4-0) || DePaula (0-1) || Borowski (40) || 16,218 || 69-70
|- style="background-color:#ffbbbb"
| 140 || September 5 || Indians || 6 – 2 || Carmona (15-8) || Baker (8-7) || Pérez (1) || 13,977 || 69-71
|- style="background-color:#ffbbbb"
| 141 || September 7 || @ White Sox || 11 – 10  || Phillips (1-1) || Rincón (3-3) || || 34,104 || 69-72
|- style="background-color:#ffbbbb"
| 142 || September 8 || @ White Sox || 8 – 7 || Myers (4-0) || Cali (0-1) || Thornton (2) || 31,747 || 69-73
|- style="background-color:#bbffbb"
| 143 || September 9 || @ White Sox || 5 – 2 || Santana (15-11) || Garland (9-11) || Nathan (30) || 32,250 || 70-73
|- style="background-color:#bbffbb"
| 144 || September 10 || @ Royals || 4 – 2 || Bonser (7-12) || Buckner (0-1) || Nathan (31) || 10,525 || 71-73
|- style="background-color:#bbffbb"
| 145 || September 11 || @ Royals || 6 – 3 || Baker (9-7) || Davies (6-13) || Nathan (32) || 12,891 || 72-73
|- style="background-color:#ffbbbb"
| 146 || September 12 || @ Royals || 6 – 3 || Meche (8-12) || Silva (11-14) || || 10,102 || 72-74
|- style="background-color:#ffbbbb"
| 147 || September 14 || Tigers || 4 – 2 || Robertson (8-11) || Garza (3-6) || Jones (35) || 22,282 || 72-75
|- style="background-color:#ffbbbb"
| 148 || September 15 || Tigers || 4 – 3 || Zumaya (2-3) || Santana (15-12) || Jones (36) || 35,230 || 72-76
|- style="background-color:#ffbbbb"
| 149 || September 16 || Tigers || 6 – 4 || Jurrjens (3-1) || Baker (9-8) || Jones (37) || 21,771 || 72-77
|- style="background-color:#bbffbb"
| 150 || September 17 || Rangers || 5 – 4 || Nathan (4-2) || Benoit (7-4) || || 14,197 || 73-77
|- style="background-color:#bbffbb"
| 151 || September 18 || Rangers || 4 – 2 || Silva (12-14) || Millwood (9-13) || Nathan (33) || 18,226 || 74-77
|- style="background-color:#bbffbb"
| 152 || September 19 || Rangers || 4 – 2 || Garza (4-6) || Padilla (6-10) || Nathan (34) || 17,842 || 75-77
|- style="background-color:#ffbbbb"
| 153 || September 21 || White Sox || 6 – 4 || Buehrle (10-9) || Santana (15-13) || Jenks (39) || 27,928 || 75-78
|- style="background-color:#ffbbbb"
| 154 || September 22 || White Sox || 8 – 3 || J. Vázquez (14-8) || Baker (9-9) || || 31,737 || 75-79
|- style="background-color:#bbffbb"
| 155 || September 23 || White Sox || 7 – 1 || Slowey (4-0) || Floyd (1-5) || || 29,382 || 76-79
|- style="background-color:#bbffbb"
| 156 || September 24 || @ Tigers || 2 – 0 || Silva (13-14) || Robertson (8-13) || Nathan (35) || 32,716 || 77-79
|- style="background-color:#ffbbbb"
| 157 || September 25 || @ Tigers || 8 – 0 || Bazardo (2-1) || Garza (4-7) || || 31,394 || 77-80
|- style="background-color:#ffbbbb"
| 158 || September 26 || @ Tigers || 9 – 4  || Byrdak (3-0) || Blackburn (0-1) || || 35,375 || 77-81
|- style="background-color:#bbffbb"
| 159 || September 27 || @ Red Sox || 5 – 4 || Bonser (8-12) || Beckett (20-7) || Nathan (36) || 36,743 || 78-81
|- style="background-color:#ffbbbb"
| 160 || September 28 || @ Red Sox || 5 – 2 || Matsuzaka (15-12) || Slowey (4-1) || Papelbon (37) || 36,843 || 78-82
|- style="background-color:#ffbbbb"
| 161 || September 29 || @ Red Sox || 6 – 4 || Wakefield (17-12) || Blackburn (0-2) || Okajima (5) || 36,619 || 78-83
|- style="background-color:#bbffbb"
| 162 || September 30 || @ Red Sox || 3 – 2 || Garza (5-7) || Tavárez (7-11) || Nathan (37) || 36,364 || 79-83

Roster

Player stats

Batting

Starters by position
Note: Pos = Position; G = Games played; AB = At bats; H = Hits; Avg. = Batting average; HR = Home runs; RBI = Runs batted in

Other batters
Note: G = Games played; AB = At bats; H = Hits; Avg. = Batting average; HR = Home runs; RBI = Runs batted in

Pitching

Starting pitchers
Note: G = Games pitched; IP = Innings pitched; W = Wins; L = Losses; ERA = Earned run average; SO = Strikeouts

Other pitchers
Note: G = Games pitched; IP = Innings pitched; W = Wins; L = Losses; ERA = Earned run average; SO = Strikeouts

Relief pitchers
Note: G = Games pitched; W = Wins; L = Losses; SV = Saves; ERA = Earned run average; SO = Strikeouts

Other post-season awards
Calvin R. Griffith Award (Most Valuable Twin) – Torii Hunter
Joseph W. Haynes Award (Twins Pitcher of the Year) – Johan Santana
Bill Boni Award (Twins Outstanding Rookie) – Matt Garza
Charles O. Johnson Award (Most Improved Twin) – Carlos Silva
Dick Siebert Award (Upper Midwest Player of the Year) – Pat Neshek
Bob Allison Award (Leadership Award) – Mike Redmond
Mike Augustin Award ("Media Good Guy" Award) – Torii Hunter
The above awards are voted on by the Twin Cities chapter of the BBWAA
Carl R. Pohlad Award (Outstanding Community Service) – Johan Santana
Sherry Robertson Award (Twins Outstanding Farm System Position Player) – Brian Buscher
Jim Rantz Award (Twins Outstanding Farm System Pitcher) – Kevin Slowey
Kirby Puckett Award (Alumni Community Service) – Tony Oliva
Herb Carneal Award (Lifetime Achievement Award) – Tom Mee

Farm system 

LEAGUE CHAMPIONS: Elizabethton

References

Game Logs:
1st Half: Minnesota Twins Game Log on ESPN.com
2nd Half: Minnesota Twins Game Log on ESPN.com

Minnesota Twins seasons
Minnesota Twins season
2007 in sports in Minnesota